Boohwal (is a South Korean rock band, formed in 1985 by the lead guitarist/songwriter Kim Tae-won.

History

Formation and the 1980s 
Kim Tae-won changed the name of the group from "The End" to "부활" ("Boohwal") in ‘86 following the departure of the vocalist Kim Jong Seo (김종서). They led the heavy metal boom in the 80s along with other bands such as Baekdoosan (백두산), Sinawe (시나위), and Black Hole (블랙홀). Boohwal, Baekdoosan, and Sinawe were called the ‘Big 3’ by the media as they were all led by talented guitarists (Boohwal – Kim Tae Won, Baekdoosan – Kim Do Kyun 김도균, Sinawe – Shin Dae Chul 신대철), had unique talented vocalists and all aimed to create heavy metal music. However, unlike bands like Sinawe, they have been concentrating more on Korean-style melodic rock ballads, especially after their 3rd album.

After receiving high praises in the underground music scene for their music, they became instantly popular once they released their first major album. The album featured the most popular vocalist to come out of Boohwal, Lee Seung-Cheol (이승철). The title song, "희야" (Heeya) became an instant hit. Kim Tae Won produced bell ringing sounds with his guitar for that song and many aspiring guitarists tried to mimick it. The 2nd album, also with Lee Seung Chul, was also a big success. Their success was a result of many aspects, including Kim Tae Won's ability to write beautiful songs ranging from rock to ballad, Lee Seung Chul's ability to sing, and Boohwal's overall talent for music. However, Lee Seung Chul and Kim Tae Won went their separate ways in 1988. Kim Tae Won worked on many side projects until getting the band together for their 3rd album.

1990s 
After regrouping, they released their third album in 1993 featuring the hit single “사랑할수록” (Sarang hal soo rok – The More I Love). The album was a success, partly due to the emotional story of Kim Jae Gi (김재기), the original vocalist at the start of the recording, who died in a traffic accident. After the death of Kim Jae Gi, Kim Jae Hee(김재희), who was the younger brother of Kim Jae Gi, was scouted by Kim since his voice color resembled that of his brother. He did not record any of the songs on the third album, but he later became the official vocalist and went on to record the fourth album. Unfortunately, the album was a failure. Kim Jae Hee left Boohwal after the fourth album. Unlike in the 80s, rock music in Korea didn't fare well in the 90s, with the emergence of dance music as the most popular genre of music. Although Kim Tae Won kept Boohwal (부활) from disappearing as many other rock bands did during that time, they went through many lineup changes.

In 1997, Kim discovered another talented vocalist, Park Wan-kyu and recorded Boohwal's 5th album with their title song "Lonely Night." They succeed making a big hit in the Korean music industry once again. Park did not stay long with Boohwal, and Boohwal started another search for a new vocalist.

2000s 
In 2002, they teamed up with Lee Seung-Cheol (이승철) again, releasing their eighth album 새, 벽 (Sae Byuk – Bird, Wall). The title song, “Never Ending Story”, was one of the most popular songs that year. With this album they not only regained popularity among the older fans who remember them from the 80s, but also teenagers who thought Lee Seung-cheol was a newcomer. Although most people welcomed the new album, some critics argued that Boohwal's music had become too soft, especially Kim Tae Won's style of playing the guitar.

2005 marked Boohwal's 20th anniversary. They have been one of the most prominent Korean bands, making music for more than 20 years. They continue to create melodic rock with talented vocalists and talented musicians. Many popular singers went through Boohwal including Kim Jong Seo, Lee Seung Chul, Park Wan-kyu, and others.

2008–2009 was a turning point for Boohwal, when its leader, Kim Tae Won, showed up on many different variety shows on MBC, SBS, and KBS. He eventually became a regular on the currently-popular show Qualifications of Men (남자의 자격) , which is the second part of the KBS show Happy Sunday. Also, with their new vocalist, Jung Dong Ha, they started to attract more fans, surprisingly girls.

2010s – Present 

Disappearing at the end of 2013, they reappeared (reborn) in 2014 with their new vocalist Kim Dong Myung on Immortal Great Songs 2 (TV KBS2) . They's restarted concerts and showing up on the medias. 
 
2015 marked Boohwal's 30th anniversary with 10th vocal Kim Dong Myung. They re- proved their legendary careers.

2015-2016 are good missionary joining years for the public relation songs about longing for reunification of two Koreas (To be ONE & PROLOGUE), spread and use refined words (AS SONGS) and advertise the Korea traditional wine (MAKGEOLI DREAM).

In 2019, the band announced Park Wan-kyu has returned as Boohwal's vocalist.

Members

Current members 
 Vocalist — Park Wan-kyu
 Guitarist — Kim Tae-won
 Bassist — Lee Yoon-jong
 Drummer — Chae Jae-min

Past members 
Past members are lined up according to their involvement years, and album.

Discography

Studio albums

Digital Singles

Collaborations

TV Appearances

Commercials

Awards

Mnet Asian Music Awards

Other Awards 
 Winner of 10th Grand Prize at the 2009 Korean Cultural Entertainment Grand Prix .

See also

External links

References

Sources
 
 
 

South Korean heavy metal musical groups
Musical quartets
Musical groups established in 1985
South Korean rock music groups
MAMA Award winners
1985 establishments in South Korea